Donald Johnson and Kimberly Po-Messerli were the defending champions but lost in the quarterfinals to Leoš Friedl and Daniela Hantuchová.

Friedl and Hantuchová defeated Mike Bryan and Liezel Huber in the final, 4–6, 6–3, 6–2 to win the mixed doubles tennis title at the 2001 Wimbledon Championships.

Seeds

  Todd Woodbridge /  Rennae Stubbs (second round)
  Ellis Ferreira /  Ai Sugiyama (quarterfinals)
  Sandon Stolle /  Cara Black (second round)
  Mahesh Bhupathi /  Elena Likhovtseva (semifinals)
  Donald Johnson /  Kimberly Po-Messerli (quarterfinals)
  Leander Paes /  Lisa Raymond (third round)
  Jared Palmer /  Arantxa Sánchez Vicario (first round)
  Joshua Eagle /  Barbara Schett (first round)
  Mark Knowles /  Nicole Arendt (third round)
  Lucas Arnold Ker /  Paola Suárez (second round)
  Petr Pála /  Janette Husárová (first round)
  Rick Leach /  Amanda Coetzer (third round)
  Jiří Novák /  Miriam Oremans (third round)
  Jeff Tarango /  Jelena Dokić (third round)
  David Rikl /  Karina Habšudová (semifinals)
  Pavel Vízner /  Tathiana Garbin (second round)

Draw

Finals

Top half

Section 1

Section 2

Bottom half

Section 3

Section 4

References

External links

2001 Wimbledon Championships on WTAtennis.com
2001 Wimbledon Championships – Doubles draws and results at the International Tennis Federation

X=Mixed Doubles
Wimbledon Championship by year – Mixed doubles